The 1962 Princeton Tigers football team was an American football team that represented Princeton University during the 1962 NCAA University Division football season. Princeton tied for third in the Ivy League.

In their sixth year under head coach Dick Colman, the Tigers compiled a 5–4 record and outscored opponents 187 to 146. Daniel Terpack was the team captain.

Princeton's 4–3 conference record tied for third-best in the Ivy League standings. The Tigers outscored Ivy opponents 157 to 123. 

Princeton played its home games at Palmer Stadium on the university campus in Princeton, New Jersey.

Schedule

References

Princeton
Princeton Tigers football seasons
Princeton Tigers football